"Pop Champagne" is a song by American hip hop recording artists Ron Browz and Jim Jones, officially released as a single on September 4, 2008 by Columbia and Universal Motown Records. The song features a guest appearance from fellow American rapper and Jones' Dipset cohort Juelz Santana. The song serves as the lead single from Jones' fourth studio album Pray IV Reign (2009). The song proved to be Jones' second most successful single to date, behind his 2006 hit "We Fly High".

Background
"Pop Champagne" featuring Jim Jones and Juelz Santana is actually a remix. The original is solely the producer of the song, Ron Browz. "I was going home one day, and DJ Jazzy Joyce — at 4:30 in the morning — was playing the [song]," Jim Jones recalled of the first time he heard "Pop Champagne." "And I know how much Ron wanted to become an artist and break into the game. ... So when I heard it, I was like, 'Damn, it got a good sound.' ... I was just being courteous, as he did so many hot beats for me. ... So, I jumped on the track, like, 'Let's see what it do.' It started to sound a little bit crazy, and I said, 'Well, let's see if we put Juelz Santana on it how crazy could it get. And I called Young Hub, and Hub was like, 'Aiight, on the strength of you, I'll jump on it for you."

Music video
The music video was directed by Dale Resteghini (a.k.a. Rage) and Jim Jones (a.k.a. Capo). It features cameo appearances by Dame Dash, Busta Rhymes, Mike Epps and Jessica Rich (a.k.a. "Rabbit") from Real Chance of Love.

Charts

Weekly charts

End of year charts

References

External links
Jim Jones - Pop Champagne (Feat. Ron Browz & Juelz Santana) Behind The Scenes

Jim Jones (rapper) songs
Juelz Santana songs
Ron Browz songs
Song recordings produced by Ron Browz
2008 debut singles
Songs written by Jim Jones (rapper)
2008 songs
Universal Motown Records singles
Songs written by Ron Browz
Songs written by Juelz Santana
MNRK Music Group singles
Music videos directed by Dale Resteghini
Songs about alcohol